Uthaug is a village in the municipality of Ørland in Trøndelag county, Norway.

Uthaug is home to fish processing and concrete manufacturing industries. It also has a good harbor with a breakwater.  The Uthaugsgården museum is an old preserved trading post that is located in the village.

References

Villages in Trøndelag
Ørland